Wally Gagel is an American, multi platinum, award-winning record producer, audio engineer, mixer, multi-instrumentalist and songwriter. 

Credits include: Family of the Year, Elliphant, Blondfire, Zella Day, Best Coast, Cold War Kids, Miley Cyrus, Billie Eilish, New Order, Muse, Rolling Stones, Britney Spears, Jessica Simpson, Rihanna, Redlight King, Eels, Robert DeLong and in collaboration with iTunes Sessions: Bon Iver, Edward Sharpe and the Magnetic Zeros, Gorillaz, The Gaslight Anthem, Lykke Li, Vampire Weekend, Black Rebel Motorcycle Club, PJ Harvey, Metric, The Decemberists, Norah Jones, and more. His production of Family of the Year's #1 single "Hero" caught the attention of movie director Richard Linklater who used it in the film "Boyhood."

In 2006 he formed the production partnership WAX LTD with songwriter and producer, Xandy Barry and in 2019 they formed a joint venture with Universal Music Production Group called AUDIO WAX.

Biography 

Early life and career

Gagel was born in Port Jefferson, NY. He and his family moved to Boston, MA, where at a young age he became interested in music. He attended Mass College of Art to pursue studies in Interrelated Media. After college Gagel became house engineer at Fort Apache Studios in Cambridge, MA where he worked with Superchunk, Belly, Juliana Hatfield, Buffalo Tom, Come, Karate, Sebadoh and The Folk Implosion. He joined the band Orbit whom he toured and recorded with until deciding to leave the group and pursue his production work full-time.  In 1996 Gagel was awarded the Boston Music Awards' Outstanding Song/Songwriter of the Year for Natural One, and in 1997 Debut Album of the Year for Orbit's Libido Speedway.  He currently resides in Los Angeles and is half of the production/songwriting team WAX LTD.

Discography 

Albums produced
2023, Redlight King - “In Our Blood” LP - AFM Records - Co-Writer, Producer, Instruments, Engineer, Mixer 
2023, Joshua Radin - This One’s For Single - Nettwerk Music Group - Producer, Engineer, Programming, Instruments, Mixer 
2023, Blondfire - “Age of Innocence” - Bliss Productions - Co-Writer, Producer, Engineer, Instruments, Mixer 
2023, Joshua Radin - Though the World Will Tell Me So, Vol 1 EP - Nettwerk Music Group - Producer, Engineer, Programming, Instruments, Mixer 
2022, Superchunk - “Wild Loneliness” LP - Merge Records - Mixer 
2020, Cold War Kids - "Story of our Lives" single -  “Bill and Ted Face the Music (Original Motion Picture Soundtrack) TenThousand Projects - Producer, Engineer, Mixer
2020, Creeper - "Sex, Death and the Infinite Void" LP - Warner UK - Mixer
2020, Blondfire - "Starboy" single - Bliss Productions - Producer, Co-writer, Engineer Mixer
2020, Blondfire - "Marigold" single - Bliss Productions - Producer, Co-writer, Engineer Mixer
2020, Blondfire - "The Climb" single - Bliss Productions - Producer, Co-writer, Engineer Mixer
2020, Overcoats (duo) - "Fire & Fury" single - Loma Vista - Co-writer
2020, Jon Bryant - "Bad Happens" single - Nettwerk Records - Producer, Engineer, Mixer
2020, Creeper - "Annabelle" single - Warner Records - Mixer
2019  Jim and Sam - “Saturday Night” - Single - Nettwerk Music Group - Producer, Engineer, Programming, Mixer 
2019, Jon Bryant - "Headphones" single - Nettwerk Records - Producer, Engineer, Mixer
2019, Jim and Sam - "Saturday Night" single - Nettwerk Records - Producer, Engineer, Mixer
2018, Elliphant - "To The End" single - TEN Music Group - Composer, Producer, Engineer, Mixer
2018, Transmission Project Feat Elan Atias - "Whatever You Feel" single - WAX LTD - Producer, Co-writer, Instruments, Engineer, Mixer
2018, Emerson Star - "Pistol Grip" single - WAX LTD - Producer, Co-writer, Engineer, Mixer
2018, Meiko - "Back in the Game" single - WAX LTD - Producer, Co-Writer, Instruments, Engineer, Mixer
2018, Rows - "Parachute" single - WAX LTD - Producer, Engineer, Mixer
2018, Ships Have Sailed - "Let's Just Dance" single - WAX LTD - Producer, Engineer, Mixer
2017, Emerson Star - "Wasted" single - WAX LTD - Producer, Instruments, Engineer, Mixer
2017, WORLDS - "Strange Feeling" single - WAX LTD - Producer, Instruments, Engineer, Mixer
2017, Nona - "Otherways" EP - WAX LTD - Producer, Instruments, Engineer, Mixer
2017, WORLDS - "Good Sh*t" single - WAX LTD - Producer, Instruments, Engineer, Mixer
2017, Nona - "Fathers Day" single - WAX LTD - Producer, Instruments, Engineer, Mixer
2017, Rows - "Simplicity" single - WAX LTD - Producer, Co-Writer, Instruments, Engineer, Mixer
2017, Rows - "Chained to the Rhythm" single - WAX LTD - Producer, Engineer, Mixer
2017, Blondfire - "Black Hole Sun" single - WAX LTD - Producer, Instruments, Engineer, Mixer
2017, Red Rosamond - "Voodoo Love" single - WAX LTD - Producer, Co-Writer, Instruments, Engineer, Mixer
2017, Rows - "Supernatural" single - WAX LTD - Producer, Co-Writer, Instruments, Engineer, Mixer
2017, Transmission Project ft. Lenka - "Golden Moment" single - WAX LTD - Producer, Co-Writer, Instruments, Engineer, Mixer
2017, Rows - "New Heart" single - WAX LTD - Producer, Co-Writer, Instruments, Engineer, Mixer
2017, Red Rosamond - "Don't Let Our Love Go Cold" single - WAX LTD - Producer, Co-Writer, Instruments, Engineer, Mixer
2017, Jukebox the Ghost - "Stay the Night" single - WAX LTD - Producer, Engineer, Mixer
2017, Blondfire - "Here and Now" single - WAX LTD - Producer, Co-Writer, Instruments, Engineer, Mixer
2017, Nona - "Hold Up" single - WAX LTD - Producer, Engineer, Mixer
2017, Max and the Moon - "Killing Time" single - WAX LTD - Producer, Co-Writer, Instruments, Engineer, Mixer
2016, Blondfire - "Heathens" single - WAX LTD - Producer, Instruments, Engineer, Mixer
2016, Blondfire - "True Confessions" EP - WAX LTD - Producer, Co-Writer, Instruments, Engineer, Mixer
2016, Larkin Poe - "Trouble In Mind" single - RH Records - Producer, Co-Writer, Instruments, Engineer
2016, Blondfire - "True Confessions" single - WAX LTD - Producer, Co-Writer, Instruments, Engineer, Mixer
2016, Escondido - Walking With A Stranger LP - Kill Canyon - Mixer, Additional Production
2015, Blondfire - "Pleasure" single - Wax LTD - Producer, Engineer, Mixer
2015, MOBIVSTRIP - MOBIVSTRIP EP - FF1 - Producer, Engineer, Writer, Instruments, Mixer
2015, Robert DeLong - In the Cards LP - Glassnote Records - Producer, Engineer, Writer, Mixer
2015, Family of the Year - Loma Vista LP - Nettwerk Productions - Producer, Engineer, Instruments and Mixer
2015, Hunter Hunted - Hunter Hunted EP - RCA Records - Producer, Co-Writer, Engineer, Instruments and Mixer
2015, Zella Day - Kicker LP - Pinetop Records/Hollywood Records - Co-writer, Producer, Engineer, Mixer
2015, Best Coast - California Nights LP  - Producer, Engineer, Mixer
2015, Zella Day - "Sacrifice" - Insurgent Soundtrack - Co-writer, Producer, Engineer, Mixer
2014, Zella Day - Zella Day EP - B3 Science - Co-writer, Producer, Engineer, Mixer
2014, Family of the Year - "Hero" - Boyhood Soundtrack - Producer, Engineer, Mixer
2014, The Mowglis - "Your Friend" - Earth To Echo Soundtrack - Relativity - Producer, Mixer, Engineer
2014, Zella Day - "East Of Eden" - B3 Science - Co-writer, Producer, Engineer, Mixer
2014, Zella Day - "Sweet Ophelia" "1965" Single - B3 Science - Co-writer, Producer, Engineer, Mixer
2014, Blondfire - Young Heart - Co-Producer, Mixer, Engineer, Instruments and Co-Writer
2013, Best Coast - Fade Away (Mini Album)  - Producer, Engineer, Mixer
2013, Cillie Barnes - Happy Valley EP - Universal Republic Records - Co-Producer, Engineer
2013, Sebadoh - Defend Yourself - Joyful Noise Recordings - Mixer
2013, Redlight King - Born To Rise (single) - Hollywood Records - Producer, Co-Writer, Engineer, Instrumentation and Mixer
2013, Redlight King - Redemption - Iron Man 3 Heroes Fall Soundtrack - Hollywood Records - Producer, Co-Writer, Engineer, Instrumentation and Mixer
2013, Black Prairie - Performs Wild Ones LP - Warner Bros. - Producer, Engineer
2013, Best Coast - "Fear of My Identity"/"Who Have I Become" single - Producer, Engineer, Mixer
2013, Hunter Hunted - Hunter Hunted EP - Producer, Engineer, Mixer
2012, Blondfire - Where The Kids Are EP - Warner Bros. - Producer, Engineer, Mixer
2012, Family of the Year - Loma Vista LP - Nettwerk Productions - Producer, Engineer, Mixer
2012, Zella Day - Cynics vs. Dreamers EP - WAX LTD. - Co-writer, Producer, Engineer, Mixer, Instruments
2012, Bon Iver - iTunes Originals
2012, Imperial Teen - Feel The Sound LP - Merge Records - Mixer
2012, Family of the Year - Diversity EP - Nettwerk Productions - Producer, Engineer, Mixer
2012, We Are Augustines - iTunes Originals
2012, Lady Danville - Operating (single) - Producer, Engineer, Mixer
2011, Grace Potter and the Nocturnals - iTunes Originals
2011, The Head and the Heart - iTunes Originals
2011, Javier Colon - Come Through For You - Universal - Mixer
2011, Blondfire - We Are The Kids - Tender Tender Rush - Mixer
2011, The Gaslight Anthem - iTunes Originals
2011, Lykke Li - iTunes Originals
2011, Family of the Year - St. Croix EP - Tiny Ogre/Sony - Mixer
2011, PJ Harvey - iTunes Originals
2011, The Decemberists - iTunes Originals
2011, Redlight King - Something For The Pain - Hollywood Records - Producer, Engineer, Mixing, Bass, Writer
2011, Best Coast - iTunes Originals
2010, Slash - iTunes Originals
2010, Joshua James - iTunes Originals
2010, Shelby Lynne - iTunes Originals
2010, Edward Sharp and the Magnetic Zeros - iTunes Originals
2010, Metric - iTunes Originals
2010, Ozomatli - iTunes Originals
2010, Maroon 5 - iTunes Originals
2010, Black Rebel Motorcycle Club - iTunes Originals
2010, Gorillaz - iTunes Originals
2010, Vampire Weekend - iTunes Originals
2010, Styrofoam - Kids on Acid Nettwerk - Producer, Engineer, Mixing
2010, Norah Jones - iTunes Originals iTunes - Mixing
2009, Tamar Kaprelian - Delicate Soul Single Interscope - Producer, Engineer
2009, Tamar Kaprelian - New Day Single Interscope - Producer, Engineer, Ins, Writer
2008, Rihanna - Good Girl Gone Bad Live - Mixing
2008, Blondfire - My Someday - Engineer, Mixing
2008, Eels - Useless Trinkets - Engineer, Mixing
2008, Styrofoam- Thousand Words - Producer, Engineer, Mixing
2008, Eels - Meet The Eels: Essential Eels, Vol. 1 (1996–2006) - Mixer, Engineer, Ins
2008, iCarly: Music from and Inspired... [Original TV Soundtrack] - Producer, Mixing, Ins, Writer
2007, Rihanna - Soundcheck (Wal-Mart) - Mixing
2007, The Billionaires - Really Real for Forever - Producer, Engineer, Mixing
2007, Hannah Montana - Hannah Montana 2: Meet Miley Cyrus - Producer, Engineer, Mixing, Bass
2006, Elan - Together as One - Guitar, Engineer, Writer
2006, Jessica Simpson - Public Affair - Producer, Engineer, Mixing, Ins, Writer
2006, Model/Actress - Model/Actress - Mixing
2006, Jessy Moss - Down at the Disco - Producer, Engineer, Mixing, Ins, Writer
2006, Old 97's - Hit by a Train: The Best of Old 97's - Producer, Engineer, Mixing, Prog, Ins
2006, Nick Lachey - What's Left of Me - Producer, Engineer, Ins, Writer
2006, Shane Nicholson - Faith and Science - Pre-Production, Writer
2006, Elan - Nothing is Worth Losing You - Guitar, Writer
2006, Gus Black - Autumn Days - Engineer, Mixing
2005, Backstreet Boys - Never Gone - Writer
2005, Jessy Moss - Polyamorous - Producer, Engineer, Mixing, Ins, Writer
2005, The Mormons - Statement of No Statement - Producer, Engineer, Mixing
2005, Sarah Blasko - The Overture & the Underscore - Producer, Engineer, Mixing, Prog, Ins
2005, Lou Barlow - Emoh - Engineer, Mixing
2005, Jessy Moss - Fast and Cheap - Producer, Engineer, Mixing, Ins, Writer
2005, New Order - Waiting for the Sirens Call (Mash) - Remix
2005, Eels - Blinking Lights and Other Revelations - Performer
2004, Feersum Ennjin - Feersum Ennjin - Mixing
2003, Gus Black - Uncivilized Love - Producer, Engineer, Mixing, Writer, Ins
2003, Thirteen [Original Soundtrack] - Producer, Engineer, Mixing, Ins, Writer
2003, Kim Fox - Return to Planet Earth - Engineer
2003, Charmed - [Original Soundtrack] - Writer
2003, Pay the Girl - Pay the Girl - Producer, Engineer, Mixing, Writer
2003, The Folk Implosion - The New Folk Implosion - Producer, Engineer, Mixing
2003, Levity - [Original Score] - Engineer, Mixing
2003, MC Honky - I Am the Messiah - Producer, Engineer, Mixing, Ins, Writer
2003, Lucia - From the Land of Volcanos - Programming, Writer
2003, Production Club - Follow Your Bliss - Producer, Engineer, Mixing, Ins, Writer
2003, Run Run Run - Drizzle - Mixer
2003, Emm Gryner - Asianblue - Producer, Engineer, Mixing, Ins, Writer
2003, Muse - Absolution - Engineer, Digital Editing
2002, Belly - Sweet Ride: The Best of Belly - Engineer, Mixing
2002, Gilmore Girls Soundtrack - Our Little Corner of the World - Producer, Engineer, Mixing
2002, Juliana Hatfield - Gold Stars 1992-2002 - Engineer
2001, Orbit - XLR8R - Mixing
2001, Eels - Souljacker - Programming, Engineer, Mixing
2001, Old 97's - Satellite Rides - Producer, Engineer
2001, Freddy Got Fingered - [Original Soundtrack] - Producer
2001, The Incredible Moses Leroy - Electric Pocket Radio - Remixing
2000, Various Artists - Fire and Skill: The Songs of the Jam - Producer, Mixing, Programming
2000, Down To You [Original Soundtrack] - Producer, Mixing, Ins, Writer
2000, Eels - Daisies of the Galaxy - Engineer, Mixing, Ins
2000, Juliana Hatfield - Beautiful Creature - Producer, Engineer, Mixing, Ins, Writer
1999, Dust Brothers - This is Your Life (Fight Club) - Remix
1999, American Beauty [Original Soundtrack] - Producer, Engineer, Mixing, Ins, Writer
1999, One Ton Shotgun - Police Navidad - Producer, Engineer, Mixing
1999, The Folk Implosion - One Part Lullaby - Producer, Engineer, Mixing, Ins, Writer
1998, Slowpoke - Virgin Stripes - Producer, Engineer
1998, Clay Pigeons [Original Soundtrack] - Producer, Engineer, Mixing
1997, Various Artists - What's Up Matador - Engineer
1997, Old 97's - Too Far to Care - Producer, Engineer, Mixing, Keys, Perc
1997, The Weaklings - Remarkably Good - Engineer, Mixing
1997, Tanya Donelly - Pretty Deep - Producer, Engineer, Mixing
1997, Juliana Hatfield - Please Do Not Disturb - Engineer, Mixer
1997, Tanya Donelly - Lovesongs for Underdogs - Producer, Mixing, Programming, Ins
1997, A Life Less Ordinary (Original Soundtrack) - Producer, Engineer, Mixing, Programming
1997, Orbit - Libido Speedway - Engineer, Mixing, Bass, Vocals
1997, The Folk Implosion - Dare to Be Surprised - Producer, Engineer, Mixing, Programming
1997, The Rolling Stones - Bridges to Babylon - Mixing
1997, Bandwagon [Original Soundtrack] - Engineer, Mixing
1996, Swish - Supermax - Engineer, Mixing
1996, Tanya Donelly - Sliding and Diving - Producer, Mixing, Engineer, Prog, Ins
1996, Come - Secret Number - Mixing
1996, Various Artists - Schoolhouse Rock! Rocks - Engineer, Mixing
1996, Various Artists - Safe and Sound - Engineer
1996, Come - Near Life Experience - Engineer
1996, Steve Wynn - Melting in the Dark - Engineer
1996, Karate - Karate - Engineer, Mixing
1996, Jack Drag - Jack Drag - Mixing
1996, Sebadoh - Harmacy - Engineer, Mixing
1996, Boys [Original Soundtrack] - Producer, Engineer, Mixer
1995, Mary Lou Lord - Mary Lou Lord, Engineer, Mixer, Tambourine
1995, Orbit - La Mano, Producer, Engineer, Mixing
1995, The Folk Implosion - Kids [Original Soundtrack], Producer, Engineer, Mixing, Ins, Writer
1995, Pell Mell - Interstate - Engineer, Mixing
1995, Superchunk - Here's Where the Strings Come In - Engineer, Mixing
1994, Belly - Super-Connected - Engineer, Mixing

References

External links
[ Wally Gagel Discography at Allmusic]
[ Wally Gagel Songs at Allmusic]
Wally Gagel Myspace
Wally Gagel at New Order Online
Interview at Ti Chicken
Production Club
Sound On Sound Eels Article
AUDIO WAX
WAX Ltd

Record producers from New York (state)
American audio engineers
Living people
Eels (band) members
People from Port Jefferson, New York
Year of birth missing (living people)